The Legislative Assembly of the Province of Canada was the lower house of the legislature for the Province of Canada, which consisted of the former provinces of Lower Canada, then known as Canada East and later the province of Quebec, and Upper Canada, then known as Canada West and later the province of Ontario. It was created by The Union Act of 1840.

Canada East and Canada West each elected 42 members to the assembly for the first four parliaments. In 1853, following the 1851 Canadian census, the number of seats in the assembly was increased by the 4th Parliament of the Province of Canada from 84 to 130, 65 for each section, even though Canada West had a slightly larger population. The Parliamentary Representation Act of June 1853 was to take effect with the election for the 5th Parliament of the Province of Canada.

The upper house of the legislature was called the Legislative Council. The two houses, the lower house and the upper house, constituted the Parliament of the Province of Canada. (See List of Parliaments below)

The first session of parliament began in Kingston in Canada West in 1841. The second parliament and the first sessions of the third parliament were held in Montreal. On April 25, 1849, rioters protesting the Rebellion Losses Bill burned the parliament buildings. The remaining sessions of the third parliament were held in Toronto. Subsequent parliaments were held in Quebec City and Toronto, except for the last session June–August 1866 of the eighth and final parliament, which was held in the newly built Parliament building in Ottawa, the capital chosen for the Dominion of Canada.

The British North America Act of 1867 divided the Province of Canada into the provinces of Ontario and Quebec, each province having its own Legislative Assembly, as well as representation in the Parliament of Canada.

Seat of Government and Parliament Buildings

Parliament for the United Provinces of Canada drifted around the cities of Toronto, Kingston, Montreal, Quebec City and Ottawa. For exhaustive detail on how Parliament tried to resolve the issue of a permanent capital, see below David B. Knight, Choosing Canada's Capital: Conflict Resolution in a Parliamentary System (Carleton Library Series, 1991).

 1841–1843 three sessions were held at the 3 storey Kingston General Hospital
 1843 Parliament moves to Montreal and sites at renovated St. Anne's Market; burned down in 1849; rebuilt as market only and burned down again in 1902; site later was a parking lot and now public square called Place d'Youville.
 1849 temporary sites for Parliament at Bonsecours Market and the Freemason's Hall, Montreal for single session.
 1849–1850 Parliament returns to Toronto to the site of the Third Parliament Buildings at Front and Simcoe Streets.
 1851 Parliament relocates to Quebec City in 1851 to the Quebec Parliament Building until fire destroys the building in 1854.
 1854–1859 Parliament remains in Quebec City and relocates to Quebec Music Hall and Quebec City Courthouse.
 1859 Parliament returns to Toronto to the site of the last parliament held there in 1849–1851 sessions.
 1860–1865 Parliament returns to Quebec to the newly re-built Parliament Buildings, Quebec at Parc Montmorency; re-used as Parliament of the Province of Quebec 1867–1883
 1866 Parliament assembles in Ottawa on Parliament Hill in the original Centre Block for one sitting June–August 1866. This Centre Block became the Parliamentary building of the Dominion of Canada 1 July 186 and was destroyed by fire in 1916 and replaced by a new one.

List of Parliaments 
1st Parliament of the Province of Canada 1841–1843
2nd Parliament of the Province of Canada 1844–1847
3rd Parliament of the Province of Canada 1848–1851
4th Parliament of the Province of Canada 1852–1854
5th Parliament of the Province of Canada 1854–1857
6th Parliament of the Province of Canada 1858–1861
7th Parliament of the Province of Canada 1861–1863
8th Parliament of the Province of Canada 1863–1866

Speakers

The role of speaker began a tradition of alternating between English and French Canada. This tradition carried onto the role of the Speaker of the House of Commons of Canada.

See also

 Legislative Assembly of Lower Canada – Legislature replaced by the Legislature of the Province of Canada
 Legislative Assembly of Upper Canada – Legislature replaced by the Legislature of the Province of Canada
 Legislative Assembly of Ontario – succeeding legislature for Canada West
 Legislative Assembly of Quebec – succeeding legislature for Canada East
 House of Commons of Canada – succeeding parliament replacing the Legislature of the Province of Canada
 List of by-elections in the Province of Canada

References

Reading
Upper Canadian politics in the 1850s, Underhill (and others), University of Toronto Press (1967)
Alfred Todd. General Index to the Journals of the Legislative Assembly of the Province of Canada in the 4th, 5th, 6th, 7th and 8th Parliaments 1852–1866. (Ottawa: Hunter Rose & Co., 1867) https://www.canadiana.ca/view/oocihm.9_00957/3.
 David B. Knight, Choosing Canada's Capital: Conflict Resolution in a Parliamentary System (McGill-Queens University Press, 1991) https://www.jstor.org/stable/j.ctt80qgn.

External links 
 General index to the Journals of the Legislative Assembly of Canada 1841–1858, by Alfred Todd [Hathi Trust https://babel.hathitrust.org/cgi/pt?id=hvd.32044106510720&view=1up&seq=7]
 General index to the Journals of the Legislative Assembly of Canada 1852–1866, by Alfred Todd {Hathi Trust https://babel.hathitrust.org/cgi/pt?id=hvd.32044106510738&view=1up&seq=7] 
 Ontario's parliament buildings ; or, A century of legislation, 1792–1892 : a historical sketch
  Assemblée nationale du Québec (French)
 CBC.ca - Canada's 1st Parliament dig - unearthing of the old building in Montreal
Archival papers held at University of Toronto Archives and Records Management Services

Province of Canada

1840 establishments in Canada
Canada, Province of